The British XVII Corps was a British infantry corps during the First World War.

History 
British XVII Corps was formed in France in January 1916 under Lieutenant General Julian Byng. In April 1917 the Corps attacked to the east of Arras near the River Scarpe but became bogged down in rain and snow. However, the Corps held the line at Arras, continued to hold it through into 1918 and then broke the main Hindenburg Line at its strongest point in September 1918.

General Officers Commanding
Commanders included:
 9 December 1915 – 12 February 1916 Lieutenant-General Sir Charles Anderson
 12 February – 27 February 1916 Major-General Edward Montagu-Stuart-Wortley (acting)
 27 February – 25 May 1916 Lieutenant-General Julian Byng
 25 May 1916 – November 1918 Lieutenant-General Sir Charles Fergusson

References

British field corps
Corps of the British Army in World War I